Paban Singh Ghatowar (born 6 December 1950) in Sivasagar, Assam is an Indian politician.

Political career
He is a member of the Indian National Congress and has been elected Member of Parliament five times: 10th Loksabha, 11th Lok Sabha, 12th Lok Sabha, 13th Lok Sabha and 15th Lok Sabha. He was the Union Minister of State (Independent Charge), Development of North Eastern Region and Parliamentary Affairs from July 2011 to May 2014.

The five-time Dibrugarh MP first entered the Lok Sabha in 1991 after a long innings in the Indian National Trade Union Congress, Assam, where he was General-Secretary, working for the welfare of tea garden labourers. After 2009 Indian general election, he was made the chief whip, Congress Parliamentary Party, Lok Sabha. He has been Union Deputy Minister, Labour in 1991–93, Union Deputy Minister, Health and Family Welfare in 1993–95 and Union Minister of State, Health and Family Welfare.

Controversy over Black Money
WikiLeaks in 2011 had disclosed a list of Indian Swiss bank account holders, in which Paban Singh Ghatowar's name appeared. The news was carried out in many newspapers in Assam including The Assam Tribune. Ghatowar later denied having any such account.

Incidentally, Ram Jethmalani, had filed a petition in the Supreme Court submitting a list of at least 20 persons holding accounts in Swiss banks. According to his petition, a former Union minister from Assam (name not mentioned) has Rs 3,908 crore in a Swiss bank account. The matter is referred to the Supreme Court.

Personal
He is B.A. educated at Gauhati University, Guwahati, Assam Industrial Relations Training (U.K.), 1975.
His  wife Jibontara Ghatowar is Parliamentary Secy. and  Member of the Legislative Assembly in Assam.

References

India MPs 2009–2014
1950 births
Living people
Indian National Congress politicians
India MPs 1991–1996
India MPs 1996–1997
India MPs 1998–1999
India MPs 1999–2004
Lok Sabha members from Assam
United Progressive Alliance candidates in the 2014 Indian general election